Mariia Biletska, sometimes Maria Biletska (1864 – 30 December 1937) was a Ukrainian teacher. She ran a house in Lviv, where students could stay. She was a leader of the women's movement.

Life
Biletska was born in 1864 in Ternopil.

In 1899, she and Hermina Shukhevych ran the Institute of St. Olga. The institute provided a place for girls to live while they attended education in Lviv. About half of these girls came from peasant families.

In 1912 she attended a meeting organised by Konstantyna Malytska for the "Women's Committee" in Lviv to prepare for war. Others at the meeting were Olena Zalizniak (1886-1969), Olena Stepaniv and Olha Basarab. The money raised from the "National Combat Fund", they recommended, was used to fund the Ukrainian Sich Riflemen. Stepaniv would serve in that group as a rifleman.

She became the Chair of the Ukrainian Women's Union in 1921 for a year. The following year, she left the St Olga Institute. From 1925 to 1926 she was caring for people with disabilities.

Biletska died in Lviv in 1938.

References

1864 births
1937 deaths
People from Ternopil
Ukrainian women educators
19th-century women educators
20th-century Ukrainian educators